Maria Theresa Henriette Dorothea of Austria-Este (2 July 1849 – 3 February 1919) was the last Queen of Bavaria. She was the only child of Archduke Ferdinand Karl Viktor of Austria-Este and Archduchess Elisabeth Franziska of Austria.

Biography
On 20 February 1868, she married Prince Ludwig, eldest son of Bavaria's Prince Regent Luitpold, in the Augustinerkirche in Vienna. The couple had fallen in love during a visit of Ludwig to Austria to attend the burial of Archduchess Mathilda. Their decision to marry initially angered the Emperor, who had wished for her to marry Ferdinand IV, Grand Duke of Tuscany. The chief witness was Count Antonius Schaffgotsch.

The family mostly lived on their farms at Leutstetten south of Munich, where Maria Theresa cultivated rose gardens.

Maria Theresa became queen consort of Bavaria in 1913 when her husband the reigning Prince Regent proclaimed himself king as King Ludwig III in place of his living but insane cousin King Otto. She became the first Catholic queen in Bavaria since Bavaria was made a kingdom 1806. She spoke German, Hungarian, Czech, French, and Italian. 

In 1914, she hosted festivities during the royal Bavarian jubilee. She appeared with her husband when war was announced. During World War I, she visited wounded soldiers and encouraged the women of Bavaria to support the troops by providing food and clothes, including with the donations references to legendary heroines.

On 7 November 1918, Ludwig III was forced to abdicate the Bavarian throne, and Maria Theresa fled Munich with her family to Wildenwart Castle near Frasdorf, in order to escape from the Bolsheviks. The health of the Queen soon declined and she died there on 3 February 1919, being buried at the local chapel. On 5 November 1921 her remains were transferred to the cathedral of Munich along with those of her husband, who died less than a month before.

Jacobite succession
Maria Theresa was the niece and heir of the childless Francis V, Duke of Modena who had been, at the time of his death, the Jacobite heir-general to the thrones of England, Scotland and Ireland; as such, she became the heiress after his death in 1875.  Neither she, nor any of her Jacobite forebears since 1807, ever seriously pursued this claim.

Maria Theresa was the first Jacobite heir-general since James Francis Edward Stuart (1688-1766) who could also have claimed to be a natural-born citizen of Great Britain.  While she was not born on British soil, as James had been, Maria Theresa was a descendant of the Electress Sophia of Hanover.  Under the terms of the Sophia Naturalization Act 1705, the Electress Sophia and all "issue of her body" were declared to be natural-born British subjects, regardless of the actual place of their birth, unless they were Roman Catholics.  The 1705 Act was not repealed until 1948 and, consequently, Maria Theresa would have been covered by its provisions.

Following her death in 1919, Maria Theresa's son Rupprecht, Crown Prince of Bavaria inherited the Jacobite claim.  Like his mother, he and his descendants have not pursued a claim to the British thrones, although they are in the line of succession upon the basis of being legitimate descendants of George II of Great Britain.

Family

On 20 February 1868, at St. Augustine's Church in Vienna, Maria Theresa married the future Ludwig III, last king of Bavaria.

The couple had thirteen children:

 Rupprecht, Crown Prince of Bavaria (18 May 1869 – 2 August 1955).
 Princess Adelgunde (17 October 1870 – 4 January 1958), married on 20 January 1915 to Prince Wilhelm of Hohenzollern-Sigmaringen.
 Princess Maria (6 July 1872 – 10 June 1954), married on 31 May 1897 to Prince Ferdinando Pius, Duke of Calabria.
 Prince Karl (1 April 1874 – 9 May 1927).
 Prince Franz (10 October 1875 – 25 January 1957), married on 8 July 1912 to Princess Isabella Antonie of Croÿ. Had issue.
 Princess Mathilde (17 August 1877 – 6 August 1906), married on 1 May 1900 to Prince Ludwig of Saxe-Coburg and Gotha.
 Prince Wolfgang Maria Leopold (2 July 1879 – 31 January 1895).
 Princess Hildegarde (5 March 1881 – 2 February 1948).
 Princess Notburga (19 March 1883 – 24 March 1883).
 Princess Wiltrud (10 November 1884 – 28 March 1975), married on 26 November 1924 to Wilhelm, Duke of Urach.
 Princess Helmtrud (22 March 1886 – 23 June 1977).
 Princess Dietlinde (2 January 1888 – 14 February 1889), lived 13 months.
 Princess Gundelinde (26 August 1891 – 16 August 1983), married on 23 February 1919 to Johann Georg, Count von Preysing-Lichtenegg-Moos.

Honours 

  : Grand Mistress of the Order of Saint Elizabeth and Order of Theresa (19 October 1872), the Order of Merit of the Bavarian Crown, the Cross of Merit for the Year 1870/71, the Cross of Merit for Voluntary Nursing
 : Dame of the Order of Queen Maria Luisa
 : Dame of the Order of the Starry Cross (10 January 1865) and Order of Elizabeth, 1st Class
 : Red Cross Medal, 1st Class (27 January 1899)

Ancestry

References

Bibliography
 Schad, Martha. Bayerns Königinnen. Regensburg: Friedrich Pustet, 1992.  Includes a 75-page chapter on Marie Therese.
 Beckenbauer, Alfons. Ludwig III. von Bayern, 1845-1921, Ein König auf der Suche nach seinem Volk. Regensburg: Friedrich Pustet, 1987.  The standard modern biography of Marie Therese's husband.
 Glaser, Hubert. Ludwig III. König von Bayern: Skizzen aus seiner Lebensgeschichte. Prien: Verkerhrsverband Chiemsee, 1995. An illustrated catalogue of an exhibition held in Wildenwart in 1995.

External links

1849 births
1919 deaths
19th-century Austrian women
20th-century Austrian women
Austrian princesses
Mary 4 and 3
Austria-Este
Bavarian queens consort
Modenese princesses
Burials at Munich Frauenkirche